Apollon Patras B.C. in international competitions is the history and statistics of Apollon Patras B.C. in FIBA Europe and Euroleague Basketball Company European-wide professional club basketball competitions.

1980s

1986–87 FIBA Korać Cup, 3rd–tier
The 1986–87 FIBA Korać Cup was the 16th installment of the European 3rd-tier level professional basketball club competition FIBA Korać Cup, running from October 1, 1986 to March 25, 1987. The trophy was won by FC Barcelona, who defeated Limoges CSP in a two-legged final on a home and away basis. Overall, Apollon Patras achieved in present competition a record of 0 wins against 2 defeat, in one round. More detailed:

First round
 Tie played on October 1, 1986 and on October 8, 1986.

|}

1990s

1989–90 FIBA Korać Cup, 3rd–tier
The 1989–90 FIBA Korać Cup was the 19th installment of the European 3rd-tier level professional basketball club competition FIBA Korać Cup, running from September 27, 1989 to March 28, 1990. The trophy was won by Ram Joventut, who defeated Scavolini Pesaro in a two-legged final on a home and away basis. Overall, Apollon Patras achieved in present competition a record of 0 wins against 2 defeats, in one round. More detailed:

First round
 Tie played on September 27, 1989 and on October 4, 1989.

|}

1996–97 FIBA EuroCup, 2nd–tier
The 1996–97 FIBA EuroCup was the 31st installment of FIBA's 2nd-tier level European-wide professional club basketball competition FIBA EuroCup (lately called FIBA Saporta Cup), running from September 17, 1996 to April 15, 1997. The trophy was won by Real Madrid Teka, who defeated Riello Mash Verona by a result of 78–64 at Eleftheria Indoor Hall in Nicosia, Cyprus. Overall, Dexim Apollon Patras achieved in the present competition a record of 11 wins against 3 defeats, in three successive rounds. More detailed:

First round
 Day 1 (September 17, 1996)

|}

 Day 2 (September 24, 1996)

|}

 Day 3 (October 1, 1996)

|}

 Day 4 (October 8, 1996)

|}

 Day 5 (October 15, 1996)

|}

 Day 6 (November 5, 1996)

|}

 Day 7 (November 12, 1996)

|}

 Day 8 (November 19, 1996)

|}

 Day 9 (December 3, 1996)

|}

 Day 10 (December 10, 1996)

|}

 Group F standings:

Second round
 Tie played on January 14, 1997 and on January 21, 1997.

|}

Top 16
 Tie played on February 11, 1997 and on February 18, 1997.

|}

1997–98 FIBA EuroCup, 2nd–tier
The 1997–98 FIBA EuroCup was the 32nd installment of FIBA's 2nd-tier level European-wide professional club basketball competition FIBA EuroCup (lately called FIBA Saporta Cup), running from September 16, 1997 to April 14, 1998. The trophy was won by Žalgiris, who defeated Stefanel Milano by a result of 82–67 at Hala Pionir in Belgrade, Yugoslavia. Overall, Apollon Achaia Clauss achieved in the present competition a record of 8 wins against 4 defeats, in two successive rounds. More detailed:

First round
 Day 1 (September 16, 1997)

|}

 Day 2 (September 23, 1997)

|}

 Day 3 (September 30, 1997)

|}

 Day 4 (October 7, 1997)

|}

 Day 5 (October 21, 1997)

|}

 Day 6 (November 4, 1997)

|}

 Day 7 (November 11, 1997)

|}

 Day 8 (November 18, 1997)

|}

 Day 9 (December 9, 1997)

|}

 Day 10 (December 16, 1997)

|}

 Group F standings:

Second round
 Tie played on January 13, 1998 and on January 20, 1998.

|}

1998–99 FIBA Korać Cup, 3rd–tier
The 1993–94 FIBA Korać Cup was the 28th installment of the European 3rd-tier level professional basketball club competition FIBA Korać Cup, running from September 16, 1998 to March 31, 1999. The trophy was won by FC Barcelona, who defeated Adecco Estudiantes by a result of 174–163 in a two-legged final on a home and away basis. Overall, Apollon Achaia Clauss achieved in present competition a record of 6 wins against 3 defeats plus 1 draw, in four successive rounds. More detailed:

First round
 Bye

Second round
 Day 1 (October 7, 1998)

|}

 Day 2 (October 14, 1998)

|}

 Day 3 (October 21, 1998)

|}

 Day 4 (November 4, 1998)

|}

 Day 5 (November 11, 1998)

|}

 Day 6 (November 18, 1998)

|}

 Group G standings:

Third round
 Tie played on December 9, 1998 and on December 16, 1998.

|}

Top 16
 Tie played on January 13, 1999 and on January 20, 1999.

|}

See also
 Greek basketball clubs in international competitions

References

External links
FIBA Europe
EuroLeague
ULEB
EuroCup

Greek basketball clubs in European and worldwide competitions
European